Neorrhyncha congolana is a species of moth of the family Tortricidae. It is found in the Democratic Republic of the Congo.

References

Moths described in 2004
Olethreutini
Endemic fauna of the Democratic Republic of the Congo